Philip Henry Muntz (21 January 1811 – 25 December 1888) was a British businessman and Liberal politician. He was a leading figure in the politics of the rapidly growing industrial town of Birmingham in the mid-nineteenth century.

Early life and family
The Muntz family originated in modern Lithuania. Philip Henry was the son of Philip Frederick Muntz, who had moved from France to Birmingham in the late eighteenth century, and established the metal working business of Muntz & Purden. He married his business partner's daughter Catherine and made his residence at Selly Hall, Selly Oak, Worcestershire. Philip Henry was the youngest of the couple's children, born in the same year as his father's death.

Following education at Shrewsbury School, Muntz entered business as a merchant in Birmingham. In 1831 he married Wilhelmine, daughter of J. D'Olhofen, finance minister of the Grand Duchy of Baden. They lived at Edstone Hall, Warwickshire, where they were counted amongst the landed gentry.

Chartism
Together with his elder brother, George Frederic Muntz, Philip was active in Radical politics. In August 1838 they addressed a large Chartist meeting held near Birmingham. The two brothers were selected as part of an eight-person delegation to represent the English Midlands at a "general convention of the industrial classes" in London, which was to present the People's Charter to parliament.

Mayor of Birmingham
In March 1837 Muntz organised a meeting to decide on whether Birmingham should apply for a charter of incorporation under the Municipal Corporations Act 1835. The meeting unanimously decided to begin the process of petitioning for a charter, which was granted in October of the following year. Birmingham was duly incorporated as a municipal borough in November 1838, and Muntz was elected as an alderman on the new town council. In 1839 he was elected as the second mayor of the borough, holding the office for two terms. The new town council was dismissed by many Radicals who saw  it as a creation of the rival Whigs. In 1839 riots broke out in the Bull Ring, leading to the government taking over policing in Birmingham and creating a force under the control of the Home Office. The position of the Radicals on the council was undermined by the militant followers of Feargus O'Connor who advocated resisting the "government police" by armed means. When Muntz tried to chair a meeting of ratepayers on the policing situation in November 1839, he was booed and jeered. He remained a member of the town council until 1856.

Railway interests
By the 1840s numerous railways were being promoted to connect the West Midlands conurbation to the rest of the country. In 1845 Muntz formed part of the committee promoting the South Staffordshire Junction Railway, in February 1846 he was appointed auditor of the Oxford, Worcester and Wolverhampton Railway and later in the year he became chairman of the Birmingham and Oxford Junction Railway. He was also a director of the Stratford-on-Avon Railway.

Parliamentary politics
Muntz's brother, George, was Radical member of parliament Parliamentary Borough of Birmingham from 1840 to his death in 1857. In 1859 a general election was called. The election was the first at which a single Liberal Party uniting the Whigs, Radicals and Peelites, stood. Muntz was appointed the chairman of the committee formed to ensure the re-election of the two Liberal MPs, John Bright and William Scholefield, for the two-seat constituency.

Under the Second Reform Act of 1867, Birmingham's parliamentary representation was increased to three MPs. The change came into effect at the next general election in 1868, at a meeting of the Birmingham Liberal Association Muntz was chosen to contest the seat along with the two sitting MPs Bright and George Dixon (who had replaced Scholefield in 1857). The Birmingham Daily Post noted the candidacy was "approved by a large section of the manufacturers on other than political grounds. Mr Muntz, as a manufacturer himself, will represent the industrial interest of the town, which is assuredly of sufficient importance to deserve a guardian in the new Parliament". The Liberal Election Committee instituted a "Vote As You're Told" arrangement, successfully manipulating the limited voting system to elect three Liberal MPs.

In April 1870 Muntz was appointed to the Royal Commission on the Over-Regulation Purchase System. A royal warrant of 1866 had regulated payments paid for promotion and received on retirement from the British Army: the commission was tasked with examining whether payments above these levels were being made and by whom. 

Muntz was re-elected on in 1874 and 1880, retiring due to age and ill health before the 1885 general election.

Later life
In October 1888 Birmingham Corporation celebrated the golden jubilee of the town's incorporation. Muntz was granted the freedom of the borough in recognition of his efforts to secure incorporation, and as the only surviving member of the first town council. The resolution was passed unanimously by the town council "for the invaluable privileges he had conferred upon this community through his and others' exertions, and in recognition of his subsequent services in the discharge of the duties of councillor, alderman, mayor, justice of the peace and representative of the borough of Birmingham in Parliament".

Muntz suffered a "paralytic seizure" on 5 December 1888, from which he was slowly recovering when he suffered a second attack on Christmas Eve and died at his home at Leamington Spa, Warwickshire of the morning of Christmas Day. He was buried at Leamington Cemetery on 28 December, and was survived by two sons.

References

External links
 

1811 births
1888 deaths
People from Birmingham, West Midlands
Liberal Party (UK) MPs for English constituencies
UK MPs 1868–1874
UK MPs 1874–1880
UK MPs 1880–1885
People educated at Shrewsbury School
19th-century English businesspeople